John Taylor (born May 30, 1944) is an American former volleyball player who competed in the 1964 Summer Olympics.

References

1944 births
Living people
American men's volleyball players
Olympic volleyball players of the United States
Volleyball players at the 1964 Summer Olympics
Volleyball players from Los Angeles
Stanford Cardinal men's volleyball players